Real Men is an album by King Missile frontman John S. Hall and producer/multi-instrumentalist Kramer. It was released in 1991 through Shimmy Disc.

Track listing
The CD track listing on the cover is incorrect. The correct track listing appears below.

Personnel 
Adapted from Real Men liner notes.

Musicians
 John S. Hall – vocals
 Kramer – instruments, production, engineering

Design
 Dave Larr – art direction
 Michael Macioce – photography

Release history

References

External links 
 

1991 albums
Collaborative albums
Albums produced by Kramer (musician)
John S. Hall albums
Kramer (musician) albums
Shimmy Disc albums